Ndiatte Gueye (born January 19, 1985) is a Senegalese sprint canoeist. At the 2012 Summer Olympics, he competed in the Men's C-1 200 metres and C-1 1000 metres.

References

Senegalese male canoeists
Living people
Olympic canoeists of Senegal
Canoeists at the 2012 Summer Olympics
1985 births

Sportspeople from Dakar